Rene Kulitja (born 1958), also known as Wanuny Kulitja, is an Aboriginal Australian artist. She works with a range of media, including paint, glass and ceramics. Her most famous design is probably Yananyi Dreaming, which covers a Qantas Boeing 737.

Life

Early life
Rene was born in 1958, in Ernabella, South Australia. Her family are Pitjantjatjara people, and her Pitjantjatjara name is Wanuny. She grew up in northern South Australia, and then moved to Docker River following her marriage to Richard Kulitja. When Uluṟu-Kata Tjuṯa National Park was handed back to traditional owners in 1985, the couple moved to Muṯitjulu to work in tourism. Rene became involved in arts and crafts at the women's centre there shortly after, and was a founding director of Walkatjara Art. Richard became the manager of Aṉangu Tours.

As an artist
During the mid-1990s, Kulitja worked with other women artists on the interior design of the park's cultural centre. She also took a course on glasswork techniques at the University of South Australia, along with three other women. After a successful exhibition of work made using these new skills, Kulitja and the other women received a commission from the Ayers Rock Resort at Yulara for a panel of glass decorated with traditional designs.

In 2000, Kulitja was one of over 300 Aboriginal women from Central Australia to perform at the Opening Ceremony of the Summer Olympic Games in Sydney.

In 2002, Kulitja worked with Balarinji Studio in Sydney to design the exterior of a Qantas Boeing 737-800 fuselage. The design she painted was of Uluṟu. It was based on traditional designs and sacred Dreaming legends. The fleet was launched on 14 February 2002, with a special ceremony performed by singers and dancers from Muṯitjulu. The word (y) means "to go" or "to travel" in Pitjantjatjara and Yankunytjatjara. It was the third Qantas aircraft to be painted in an Aboriginal design. Kulitja did something similar again in 2010, when a semi-trailer was decorated with another of her designs as part of a national roadshow by Maṟuku Arts.

Community work
Kulitja has held an important position within the Pitjantjatjara–Yankunytjatjara community for several years. She has been a member of both the Muṯitjulu Community Council and the Board of Management of Uluṟu-Kata Tjuṯa National Park. In 2006, she became the chairperson of Maṟuku Arts. In October 2007, she was elected for a two-year term as a director on the Ngaanyatjarra, Pitjantjatjara and Yankunytjatjara Women's Council.

As a community advocate, Kulitja has campaigned to address the issues of petrol sniffing in Aboriginal communities in central Australia. Her own family has been deeply affected by the problem.

Art
She makes paintings, woven baskets, and glass and ceramic sculptures. Her work has been shown in many exhibitions across Australia. It has also been exhibited in Belgium and Japan.

An example of her glass work is shown in the National Gallery of Australia. It is a coolamon made of glass (rather than the traditional wood), and has been exhibited in several Australian galleries. Examples of her paintings are held in the National Museum of Ethnology in Osaka. Kulitja is also known for making traditional-style jewellery using modern techniques and media. Some of her jewellery work was featured on The Oprah Winfrey Show when Winfrey visited Uluṟu in December 2010.

References

1958 births
Living people
Australian painters
Australian Aboriginal artists
People from South Australia
Artists from the Northern Territory
Glass artists